Pamela Ann Rymer (January 6, 1941 - September 21, 2011) was a United States circuit judge of the United States Court of Appeals for the Ninth Circuit and a United States district judge of the United States District Court for the Central District of California.

Education and career

Born in Knoxville, Tennessee, Rymer earned an Artium Baccalaureus degree from Vassar College in 1961 and a Bachelor of Laws from Stanford Law School in 1964. She was Director of Political Research and Analysis for the Goldwater for President Committee in 1964. From 1965 to 1966, she was vice president of Rus Walton and Associates in Los Altos, California. Rymer then entered private practice from 1966 through 1983 in Los Angeles, California. She was also a member and chairman of the California Post-Secondary Education Commission from 1974 to 1984.

Federal judicial service

On January 31, 1983, Rymer was nominated by President Ronald Reagan to a seat on the United States District Court for the Central District of California vacated by Judge William Percival Gray. She was confirmed by the United States Senate on February 23, 1983, and received her commission the following day. Her service terminated on May 23, 1989, due to elevation to the Ninth Circuit.

In 1987, Reagan attempted to elevate Rymer to a seat on the United States Court of Appeals for the Ninth Circuit vacated by the elevation of Anthony Kennedy to the Supreme Court of the United States, but was rebuffed in the Senate. However, on February 28, 1989, President George H. W. Bush nominated Rymer to the same seat, and this time, she was confirmed by the United States Senate on May 18, 1989, receiving her commission on May 22, 1989.

Stanford service

Rymer served on the Stanford University Board of Trustees from 1991 to 2001. In 2010, Rymer received the Stanford Medal for her volunteer work for the university, where two scholarship funds had been created in her name.

Death

Rymer died on September 21, 2011. During her 22 years on the Ninth Circuit, Rymer sat on more than 800 panels and wrote 335 panel decisions. One of the more notable opinions was in Planned Parenthood v. American Coalition of Life Activists (2002), which held that threats on the Internet against doctors who performed abortions were not protected by the First Amendment. Fellow judge Stephen Trott said she was a "brilliant jurist" and "a joy to work with".

See also
 Ronald Reagan judicial appointment controversies
Film: "This Changes Everything" (starting at 59:00) regarding action alleging employment discrimination in violation of Title VII of the Civil Rights Act of 1964. She threw the case out.

References

External links

|-

1941 births
2011 deaths
20th-century American judges
Judges of the United States Court of Appeals for the Ninth Circuit
Judges of the United States District Court for the Central District of California
People from Knoxville, Tennessee
Stanford Law School alumni
United States court of appeals judges appointed by George H. W. Bush
United States district court judges appointed by Ronald Reagan
Vassar College alumni
20th-century American women judges